Bogdan Tsymbal (born 8 August 1997) is a Ukrainian biathlete.

Career results

Olympic Games

World Championships

Rankings

References

1997 births
Living people
Ukrainian male biathletes
Sportspeople from Sumy
Biathletes at the 2022 Winter Olympics
Olympic biathletes of Ukraine